Dehdadi or Dihdadi is a town and seat of Dihdadi District in Balkh Province in northern Afghanistan.

See also 
Balkh Province

References

Populated places in Balkh Province